Jenny Polyxeni Bloomfield is the Australian Representative to Taiwan since February 1, 2021, succeeding Gary Cowan. and was the Australian Ambassador to Greece from 2011 until 2014 with non-resident accreditation to Albania and Bulgaria. She is both the first woman and the first person of Greek descent to hold that position.

Bloomfield earned a Master of Arts in Foreign Affairs and Trade from Monash University, a Bachelor of Letters in Political Science and French and a Bachelor of Laws/Bachelor of Arts in Modern Greek from the University of Melbourne.

The mother of 4 children, Bloomfield speaks 8 languagesincluding Mandarin Chinese and Taiwanese Hokkien. During her tenure in Taiwan, she is known as Lu zhen-yi, the Chinese name she chooses for herself with the meaning of "precious dew", and the last character of her given name is a combination of Xin() and  Tai, standing for "heart" and "Taiwan" respectively.

References

Australian women ambassadors
Ambassadors of Australia to Greece
Ambassadors of Australia to Albania
Ambassadors of Australia to Bulgaria
Living people
Year of birth missing (living people)
Monash University alumni
University of Melbourne alumni
Representatives of Australia to Taiwan
Australian people of Greek descent
21st-century diplomats